Marjorie Dennison Hall Brown (born April 20, 1911, died November 23, 2000 in Sarasota, Florida) was the owner of the Boston Celtics following the death of her husband Walter A. Brown.

After the death of Walter A. Brown, the Celtics' ownership was split 50/50 between minority owner Louis Pieri and Brown's widow Marjorie Brown. Brown and Pieri sold their interest in the Celtics on June 24, 1965 to the Ruppert Knickerbocker Brewing Company, a subsidiary of Marvin Kratter's National Equities.

References

1911 births
2000 deaths
Boston Celtics owners